Herman "J. R." Reid Jr. (born March 31, 1968) is an American basketball coach and former professional player who is an assistant coach for the Monmouth Hawks men's basketball team. He played in the National Basketball Association (NBA) for the Charlotte Hornets, San Antonio Spurs, New York Knicks, Los Angeles Lakers, Milwaukee Bucks and Cleveland Cavaliers. Reid played college basketball for the North Carolina Tar Heels and was a consensus first-team All-American as a sophomore in 1988. He won a bronze medal as a member of the United States national team at the 1988 Summer Olympics.

Early life and high school career
Reid was born and raised in Virginia Beach, Virginia, and was the son of Herman Reid Sr., who played football in the 1960s with the Baltimore Colts. Reid played football himself in his early years as a defensive player and his gridiron skills even caught the attention of the Virginia Tech Hokies, but he decided to stick with playing basketball. Reid starred at Kempsville High School in Virginia Beach, being named the 1986 Gatorade and USA Today Player of the Year. He certified his reputation by being named most valuable player (MVP) of both the 1986 McDonald's Game and the Capital Classic.

College career
Reid played college basketball for the North Carolina Tar Heels from 1986 to 1989. He was named ACC Rookie of the Year in 1987 as he averaged 14.7 points and 7 rebounds per game. During his freshman year at UNC, he was featured on the March 2, 1987 cover of Sports Illustrated magazine. During his sophomore season, he was named a consensus first-team All-American when he averaged 18 points and 8.9 rebounds per game.

Reid was named to the 1988 United States men's Olympic basketball team to compete at the 1988 Summer Olympics. He played in six games and averaged 6 points per game.

College statistics

|-
| align="left" | 1986–87
| align="left" | North Carolina
| 36 || 31 || 28.6 || .584 || .000 || .653 || 7.4 || 1.8 || 1.3 || 0.8 || 14.7
|-
| align="left" | 1987–88
| align="left" | North Carolina
| 33 || 33 || 31.6 || .607 || .000 || .680 || 8.9 || 1.7 || 1.2 || 1.2 || 18.0
|-
| align="left" | 1988–89
| align="left" | North Carolina
| 27 || 16 || 26.5 || .614 || .000 || .669 || 6.3 || 1.3 || 0.9 || 0.8 || 15.9
|- class="sortbottom"
| style="text-align:center;" colspan="2"| Career
| 96 || 80 || 29.0 || .601 || .000 || .668 || 7.6 || 1.7 || 1.1 || 0.9 || 16.2
|}

Professional career
He was drafted by the Charlotte Hornets as the 5th overall pick in the 1989 NBA draft. On February 25, 1996, in a game against the Phoenix Suns, A. C. Green mentioned an incident at a New York City club before Reid hit him with a vicious right elbow in the mouth during the fourth quarter of the game, knocking out two of Green's teeth. Reid was suspended for two games and fined $10,000.

In the 1996-97 season, Reid played in France, winning the national championship with Paris Basket Racing. He returned to the NBA, before rounding out his professional career in France and Spain.

During his NBA career, he saw action in a total of 672 regular season games and 47 playoff games.

NBA career statistics

Regular season

|-
| align="left" | 1989–90
| align="left" | Charlotte
| style="background:#cfecec;"| 82* || 82 || 33.6 || .440 || .000 || .664 || 8.4 || 1.2 || 1.1 || 0.7 || 11.1
|-
| align="left" | 1990–91
| align="left" | Charlotte
| 80 || 80 || 30.8 || .466 || .000 || .703 || 6.3 || 1.1 || 1.1 || 0.6 || 11.3
|-
| align="left" | 1991–92
| align="left" | Charlotte
| 51 || 7 || 24.6 || .490 || .000 || .705 || 6.2 || 1.6 || 1.0 || 0.5 || 11.0
|-
| align="left" | 1992–93
| align="left" | Charlotte
| 17 || 1 || 17.4 || .429 || .000 || .741 || 4.1 || 1.4 || 0.6 || 0.3 || 7.5
|-
| align="left" | 1992–93
| align="left" | San Antonio
| 66 || 24 || 24.1 || .485 || .000 || .770 || 5.8 || 0.8 || 0.5 || 0.4 || 9.9
|-
| align="left" | 1993–94
| align="left" | San Antonio
| 70 || 11 || 19.2 || .491 || .000 || .699 || 3.1 || 1.0 || 0.6 || 0.4 || 9.0
|-
| align="left" | 1994–95
| align="left" | San Antonio
| 81 || 37 || 19.3 || .508 || .500 || .687 || 4.9 || 0.7 || 0.7 || 0.4 || 7.0
|-
| align="left" | 1995–96
| align="left" | San Antonio
| 32 || 5 || 20.1 || .439 || .000 || .736 || 3.8 || 0.4 || 0.8 || 0.3 || 6.5
|-
| align="left" | 1995–96
| align="left" | New York
| 33 || 16 || 20.3 || .550 || .000 || .782 || 4.0 || 0.8 || 0.5 || 0.2 || 6.6
|-
| align="left" | 1997–98
| align="left" | Charlotte
| 79 || 1 || 14.0 || .459 || .375 || .730 || 2.7 || 0.6 || 0.4 || 0.2 || 4.9
|-
| align="left" | 1998–99
| align="left" | Charlotte
| 16 || 16 || 34.8 || .521 || .000 || .798 || 7.1 || 1.6 || 1.4 || 0.6 || 15.2
|-
| align="left" | 1998–99
| align="left" | Los Angeles
| 25 || 10 || 18.9 || .407 || .000 || .717 || 4.0 || 0.9 || 0.6 || 0.0 || 5.0
|-
| align="left" | 1999–00
| align="left" | Milwaukee
| 34 || 7 || 17.7 || .417 || .143 || .768 || 3.4 || 0.5 || 0.6 || 0.1 || 4.4
|-
| align="left" | 2000–01
| align="left" | Cleveland
| 6 || 0 || 6.5 || .400 || .000 || .750 || 1.3 || 0.2 || 0.3 || 0.2 || 1.7
|- class="sortbottom"
| style="text-align:center;" colspan="2"| Career
| 672 || 297 || 22.9 || .472 || .135 || .716 || 5.0 || 1.0 || 0.8 || 0.4 || 8.5
|}

Playoffs

|-
| align="left" | 1992–93
| align="left" | San Antonio
| 10 || 2 || 22.0 || .483 || .000 || .771 || 5.0 || 1.5 || 0.8 || 0.8 || 8.5
|-
| align="left" | 1993–94
| align="left" | San Antonio
| 4 || 0 || 14.0 || .286 || .000 || .600 || 3.0 || 0.8 || 0.3 || 0.5 || 3.8
|-
| align="left" | 1994–95
| align="left" | San Antonio
| 15 || 1 || 13.9 || .492 || .000 || .846 || 2.8 || 0.6 || 0.5 || 0.3 || 6.1
|-
| align="left" | 1995–96
| align="left" | New York
| 1 || 0 || 7.0 || 1.000 || .000 || .000 || 1.0 || 1.0 || 0.0 || 0.0 || 2.0
|-
| align="left" | 1997–98
| align="left" | Charlotte
| 9 || 0 || 12.7 || .393 || .000 || .800 || 2.2 || 0.2 || 0.3 || 0.2 || 3.3
|-
| align="left" | 1998–99
| align="left" | Los Angeles
| 8 || 8 || 22.3 || .357 || .000 || .750 || 5.3 || 0.4 || 0.5 || 0.6 || 3.3
|- class="sortbottom"
| style="text-align:center;" colspan="2"| Career
| 47 || 11 || 16.7 || .437 || .000 || .794 || 3.6 || 0.7 || 0.5 || 0.4 || 5.3
|}

Post-playing career
After his NBA career, he competed to become an analyst on the former ESPN TV show Dream Job, but lost. In 2011, he was named an assistant coach for Patrick & Henry Community College. He joined the Monmouth Hawks men's basketball team in 2018 after being hired as an assistant to former UNC teammate King Rice. Reid stayed in that job until 2022.

Transactions
 Drafted by Charlotte Hornets in first round (5th overall) of 1989 NBA draft.
 Traded by Charlotte to the San Antonio Spurs for Sidney Green, a 1993 first-round pick and a 1996 second-round pick on December 9, 1992.
 Traded by San Antonio with Brad Lohaus and a future first-round pick to the New York Knicks for Charles Smith and Monty Williams on February 12, 1996.
 Played in France during 1996–97 season, winning the national championship with Paris SG, averaging 18.5 points and 8.6 rebounds per game in the French league.
 Signed as a free agent by Charlotte on July 16, 1997.
 Traded by Charlotte with B. J. Armstrong and Glen Rice to the Los Angeles Lakers for Elden Campbell and Eddie Jones on March 10, 1999.
 Signed as free agent by Milwaukee Bucks on August 20, 1999.
 Traded by Milwaukee with Robert Traylor to Cleveland Cavaliers as part of a three-team deal on June 27, 2000 (Golden State Warriors received Vinny Del Negro from Milwaukee and Bob Sura from Cleveland; Milwaukee received Jason Caffey and Billy Owens from Golden State).
 Waived by Cleveland on January 2, 2001.

References

External links 

 Monmouth Hawks coaching bio
 nba.com historical playerfile
 
 College Stats

1968 births
Living people
African-American basketball players
All-American college men's basketball players
American expatriate basketball people in France
American expatriate basketball people in Spain
American men's basketball players
Baloncesto León players
Basketball coaches from Virginia
Basketball players at the 1988 Summer Olympics
Basketball players from Virginia
Charlotte Hornets draft picks
Charlotte Hornets players
Cleveland Cavaliers players
Junior college men's basketball coaches in the United States
Los Angeles Lakers players
McDonald's High School All-Americans
Medalists at the 1988 Summer Olympics
Milwaukee Bucks players
Monmouth Hawks men's basketball coaches
New York Knicks players
North Carolina Tar Heels men's basketball players
Olympic bronze medalists for the United States in basketball
Parade High School All-Americans (boys' basketball)
Paris Racing Basket players
Participants in American reality television series
Power forwards (basketball)
San Antonio Spurs players
SIG Basket players
Sportspeople from Virginia Beach, Virginia
United States men's national basketball team players
21st-century African-American people
20th-century African-American sportspeople